Kishima refer 
 Kishima District, Saga
 Kishima Kouma
 Kishima Group
 Kashima Antlers, football club
 Kashima Shin-ryū, martial art

See also
 Kashimashi: Girl Meets Girl
 Kashima District (disambiguation)